Tierra de Cantalapiedra is a comarca in the province of Salamanca, Castile and León.  It contains six municipalities: Cantalapiedra, Cantalpino, Palaciosrubios, Poveda de las Cintas, Tarazona de Guareña and Villaflores.

References 

Comarcas of the Province of Salamanca